Lectionary 226, designated by siglum ℓ 226 (in the Gregory-Aland numbering) is a Greek manuscript of the New Testament, on parchment. Palaeographically it has been assigned to the 14th century. F. H. A. Scrivener labelled it by 249evl.
Some leaves of the manuscript were lost, and some leaves have survived in a fragmentary condition.

Description
The codex contains saints' day lessons from the Gospels of John, Matthew, Luke lectionary (Evangelistarium), on 220 parchment leaves, with lacuna at the beginning. The text is written in Greek minuscule letters, in one column per page, 21 lines per page. It has accents and breathings (in red).

The initial letters are decorated; some of decorations are zoomorphic (birds, fishes), anthropomorphic (hands), and other motifs. The most significant or interesting images are on folio 25 recto, 96 verso, 114 verso.

The manuscript contains Menologion, but many leaves of it were lost.

Fifteen leaves are palimpsest, over writing two centuries earlier, containing in double columns lessons of the Septuaginta from Book of Genesis, Book of Proverbs, and Book of Isaiah. The palimpsest text is written in 24–27 lines per page. The other 205 leaves have only one column on a page.

History
Scrivener and Gregory dated the manuscript to the 14th century. It is currently assigned by the INTF to the 14th century. The name of the scribe is unknown.

Of the early history of the codex nothing is known until the year 1864, when it was in the possession of a dealer at Janina (Epeiros). It was then purchased from him by a representative of Baroness Burdett-Coutts (1814–1906), for one hundred pounds, along with more than one hundred other Greek manuscripts. They were transported to England in 1870-1871. The manuscript was presented by Burdett-Coutts to Sir Roger Cholmely's School, and was housed at the Highgate (Burdett-Coutts III. 46), in London.

The manuscript was added to the list of New Testament manuscripts by Scrivener (number 249) and Gregory (number 226). Gregory saw it in 1883. In 1922 it was acquired for the University of Michigan.  The manuscript is now housed at the University of Michigan (Ms. 28) in Ann Arbor.

The manuscript is sporadically cited in the critical editions of the Greek New Testament (UBS3).

Gallery

See also

 List of New Testament lectionaries
 Biblical manuscript
 Textual criticism

Notes and references

Bibliography
 Kenneth W. Clark, A Descriptive Catalogue of Greek New Testament Manuscripts in America (Chicago, 1937), pp. 302–303.

External links

 Images of Lectionary 226 at the CSNTM

Greek New Testament lectionaries
14th-century biblical manuscripts
Septuagint manuscripts
Palimpsests